Nancy Boyd may refer to:

Edna St. Vincent Millay (1892–1950), American poet and playwright who used the pen name Nancy Boyd
Nancy Bruinooge (born 1963), Belgian singer whose stage name is Nancy Boyd